Eric Lee (born 1955) is an American-born activist and author. He was born in New York City and is the founding editor of LabourStart, the news and campaigning website of the international trade union movement.  He is also the author of The Labour Movement and the Internet: The New Internationalism (Pluto Press, 1996) and several other books.

Career
Lee worked as an editor for the social democratic magazine The New International Review. While living in Israel, he worked as a computer programmer and was politically active in the peace movement and the left.

In the 1990s, Lee created and ran the website BibiWatch, dedicated to criticism of Israeli Prime Minister Binyamin Netanyahu.

In this same year, he served on the Central Committee of the United Workers Party.

Lee is the author of The Labour Movement and the Internet: The New Internationalism

In 1998, Lee moved to London to work as ICT Coordinator for Labour and Society International while also consulting British and international trade unions. His articles have been published around the world and is a frequent speaker at a variety of conferences.

Personal
Lee is active in the democratic left and trade unions.

References

External links 
Eric Lee's blog
Eric Lee bio at LabourStart
"BibiWATCH Archives"

1955 births
Living people
Trade unionists from New York (state)
American emigrants to Israel
Israeli activists
Israeli writers
Trade unionists from London
Activists from New York City